The Assin-Attandanso Game Production Reserve is a protected area in Ghana falling in IUCN Category VI. It was established in 1991.

References

Protected areas of Ghana